The Indonesian Navy Special Force and Operations Command (Indonesian: Komando Operasi dan Pasukan Khusus TNI AL/INSFOC) is an elite special operations forces of the Indonesian Navy. It is a combined detachment formed from selected personnel of the Navy's Underwater Special Unit (KOPASKA), the Marine Corps' Amphibious Reconnaissance Battalion (Yontaifib), and Detasemen Jala Mangkara (Denjaka).

The Detachment was formed in 2006 by the Chief of the Indonesian Armed Forces to counter maritime strategic threats including terrorism and sabotage. Despite the specific reason for its formation, as in the case of any other special operations forces around the world, the Detachment is also fully trained in conducting reconnaissance, unconventional warfare, and clandestine behind-enemy-lines operations.

Notes

Indonesian language sources
 Indonesia Tambah Satuan Elite, Kompas 2 Agustus 2007, p.3.
 Satuan Elite Baru Milik TNI AL Majalah Angkasa December 2007, p.33.

See also

 (Sea, Air, Land) Teams

External links
TNI AL  - official site.
PUSPEN TNI AL  - official site.

Armed forces diving
Special forces of Indonesia
Indonesian Navy
Military units and formations established in 2006